The 2020–21 season was the 92nd season in the existence of A.C. ChievoVerona and the club's second consecutive in the second division of Italian football. In addition to the domestic league, Chievo participated in this season's edition of the Coppa Italia.

Players

First-team squad

Other players under contract

On loan

Competitions

Overview

Serie B

League table

Results summary

Results by round

Matches
The league fixtures were announced on 9 September 2020.

Promotion play-offs

Coppa Italia

Statistics

Goalscorers

References

A.C. ChievoVerona seasons
A.C. ChievoVerona